Richard Nguema Balboa (born 7 February 1988) is a Spanish-born Equatoguinean professional basketball player who plays for the Equatorial Guinea national team.

Profile and personal life
Nguema is a talented player with great athletic skills, very good defender and great penetrator inside.

He was born in Madrid, Spain to Equatorial Guinean parents - his father being a diplomat. As a result, he has dual citizenship with Spain and Equatorial Guinea.

He has a cousin on his mother's side, Javier Balboa, who is a professional footballer, Equatorial Guinea's international player, also born in Madrid.

Professional career
Nguema has played with several different Spanish clubs in the past, most notably starting his career with Real Madrid, where he obtained the 2006–07 ULEB Cup and the 2006–07 ACB season. Later, he played for CB Estudiantes, Obradoiro CAB and Cáceres Ciudad del Baloncesto.

He also played in Equatorial Guinea, the original country of his family, for Malabo Kings and The Panthers, and in 2017 he played for Cañeros del Este of Dominican top division Liga Nacional de Baloncesto.

National team career
Nguema has competed for Spain through multiple junior national teams, and helped the team win the bronze medal at the 2006 FIBA Europe Under-18 Championship.

He also participated at the 2007 FIBA Under-19 World Championship.

Trophies and awards

Real Madrid
 2006–07 ULEB Cup: Champion 
 2006–07 ACB season: Champion

Obradoiro CAB
 2010-11 LEB Oro: Champion 
 2010-11 Prince Cup: Champion

Spanish national team
 2006 FIBA Europe Under-18 Championship:

References

External links
 Richard Nguema at ACB.com
 Richard Nguema - Video highlights

1988 births
Living people
Citizens of Equatorial Guinea through descent
Equatoguinean men's basketball players
Point guards
Equatoguinean expatriate sportspeople
Equatoguinean expatriates in the Dominican Republic
Expatriate basketball people in the Dominican Republic
Spanish men's basketball players
Basketball players from Madrid
Spanish sportspeople of Equatoguinean descent
CB Estudiantes players
Liga ACB players
Malabo Kings players
Obradoiro CAB players
Real Madrid Baloncesto players
Spanish expatriate basketball people
Spanish expatriate sportspeople in the Dominican Republic